John Jørgensen (born 18 July 1962 in Middelfart, Denmark) is a former international motorcycle speedway rider who won the World Team Cup in 1986 and 1988. He also qualified for the World Final on two occasions and rode in the 1999 and 2000 Speedway Grand Prix.

World Final Appearances

Individual World Championship
 1988 -  Vojens, Speedway Center - 13th - 3pts
 1992 -  Wrocław, Olympic Stadium - 6th - 8pts

World Team Cup
 1986 -  Vojens, Speedway Center (with Erik Gundersen / Hans Nielsen / Tommy Knudsen / Jan O. Pedersen) - Winner - 130pts (8)
 1988 -  Los Angeles, Veterans Memorial Stadium (with Erik Gundersen / Hans Nielsen / Tommy Knudsen / Jan O. Pedersen) - Winner - 44pts (2)
 1989 -  Bradford, Odsal Stadium (with Hans Nielsen / Erik Gundersen / Gert Handberg / Brian Karger) - 2nd - 34pts (7)
 1990 -  Pardubice - 3rd - 30pts (4)
 1992 -  Lonigo - 4th - 17pts (1)
 1993 -  Coventry - 2nd - 38pts (8)

Speedway Grand Prix

World Under-21 Championship
 1982 -  Pocking - 8th - 9pts
 1983 -  Lonigo - 9th - 10pts

Danish Domestic competitions
Danish Championship
 1992 -  Uhre, Holsted - 3rd
 1995 -  Frederikslyst, Uhre - 3rd
 1998 -  Outrup - 2nd
 2000 -  Outrup - 3rd

See also
 List of Speedway Grand Prix riders
 Denmark national speedway team

References

1962 births
Living people
People from Middelfart Municipality
Danish speedway riders
Coventry Bees riders
Belle Vue Aces riders
Wolverhampton Wolves riders
Birmingham Brummies riders
Swindon Robins riders
Peterborough Panthers riders
Somerset Rebels riders
Sportspeople from the Region of Southern Denmark